Agnidahaya (Fire and Water) is a 2002 Sri Lankan Sinhala film directed and produced by Jayantha Chandrasiri for Soyanno Films. It stars Jackson Anthony and Yashoda Wimaladharma in lead roles along with Kamal Addararachchi and Sanath Gunathilake. Music composed by Premasiri Khemadasa. It is the 996th Sri Lankan film in the Sinhala cinema.

The film won seven golden awards and four silver awards at the Signis International Film Festival 2003.

Cast
 Jackson Anthony as Punchi Rala
 Yashoda Wimaladharma as Kiri Menike
 Kamal Addararachchi as Sobana
 Sanath Gunathilake as Ambanwala Rala
 Buddhadasa Vithanarachchi as Herath
 Bandula Vithanage
 Raja Ganeshan
 Dayaratne Siriwardena
 Mali Jayaweerage
 Dimuthu Chinthaka
 Raja Ganeshan
 Jayani Senanayake
 Mike Fernando

References

2002 films
2000s Sinhala-language films